Notiocampus ruber, known commonly as the red pipefish, is a species of pipefish endemic to the Indian Ocean waters along the southern coast of Australia and Tasmania. This species is the only known member of its genus.

References

red pipefish
 
red pipefish
Taxa named by Charles Eric Dawson